This is a list of events and openings related to amusement parks that occurred in 2019. These various lists are not exhaustive.

Amusement parks

Opening

Indonesia Atlantis Land
Indonesia Bandung Champion City – March 24
U.S. Big SNOW American Dream in American Dream Meadowlands – December 5
China Guangzhou Sunac Cultural Tourism City
China Oriental Heritage Changsha
UAE Kidzania Abu Dhabi – June 26
Qatar Kidzania Doha – May 1
U.S. Kidzania Dallas – November 23
Africa Kidzania Johannesburg
Indonesia Kidzania Surabaya – November 2019
China Lionsgate Entertainment World – July 31
U.S. Nickelodeon Universe in American Dream Meadowlands – October 25
Indonesia Panama Park 825 – Opening June 1 – Reopening September 30
South Korea Gyeongnam Mason Robotland – September 6
Oman Snow Park Mall Of Muscat – July 26
Indonesia Transmart Malang – February 22
Indonesia Trans Snow World – Juanda > March 25 – Bintaro > December 21
Indonesia Trans Studio Bali – December 12
Indonesia Trans Studio Cibubur – July 12
Indonesia Trans Studio Mini Malang – February 22
Indonesia Trans Studio Mini Tasikmalaya
Turkey Wonderland Eurasia – March 20

Change of name 

 U.S. Darien Lake Theme Park Resort » Six Flags Darien Lake
 U.S. Wet N' Wild Phoenix » Six Flags Hurricane Harbor Phoenix
 U.S. Wet N' Wild Splashtown » Six Flags Hurricane Harbor SplashTown

Change of ownership
U.S. Schlitterbahn – The Henry family » Cedar Fair
Belgium Comic Station Antwerp – Independent » Plopsa

Birthday

Legoland California – 20th Anniversary
Thorpe Park – 40th Anniversary
Energylandia – 5th Anniversary
Wonderland Ankara – 15th Anniversary
Mirabilandia Olinda – 25th Anniversary
Gulliver's Land – 20th Anniversary
Happy Valley Chengdu – 10th Anniversary
Cinecittà World – 5th Anniversary
PowerPark – 20th Anniversary
Happy Valley Shanghai – 10th Anniversary
Universal's Islands of Adventure – 20th Anniversary
Chimelong Ocean Kingdom – 5th Anniversary
Adventure City – 25th Anniversary
Busch Gardens Tampa – 60th Anniversary
Walibi Rhône-Alpes – 40th Anniversary
Trans Studio Makassar – 10th Anniversary

Closed
Bedrock City Arizona – January 28
Scandia Amusement Park (Ontario) – February 3
Sybrandy's Speelpark – August 25
Boomers! Medford – September 29
La Feria de Chapultepec

Additions

Roller coasters

New

Relocated

Refurbished

Other attractions

New

Refurbished

Closed attractions and roller coasters

References

Amusement parks by year
Amusement parks